Below is the list of World War I flying aces from New Zealand. While New Zealand did not have its own military air service during World War I, many New Zealanders did join Australian or British military aviation to fight in the war. Some of New Zealand's first class of aces continued to serve post-war, whether in the Royal Air Force or the Royal New Zealand Air Force; some served in World War II. Several earned advanced rank in the process.

References

New Zealand
World War I flying aces
New Zealand aviators